Chlorocresol may refer to either of two chemical compounds:

 2-Chloro-m-cresol
 p-Chlorocresol